An aul  is a type of fortified village found throughout the Caucasus mountains. 

Aul or AUL may also refer to:

Places
 Aul of Omurtag in Bulgaria; see Palace of Omurtag
 Aul Kochalyar, a village in the Khizi Rayon of Azerbaijan; see Kechallyar
 Piz Aul, a mountain of the Lepontine Alps

Acronyms and abbreviations
 aul, an abbreviation for Aulua language
 Aquinas University of Legazpi; see Aquinas University
 Americans United for Life, an American anti-abortion organization
 Arctic Umiaq Line, a passenger and cargo coastal ferry in Greenland
 Arts, Sciences and Technology University in Lebanon
 Cork AUL, an Irish junior soccer league

See also
 Auls, a settlement in Gmina Kuźnica, Sokółka County, Podlaskie Voivodeship, Poland
 Auld (disambiguation)
 Awl (disambiguation)
 All (disambiguation)
 Al (disambiguation)